Seminal Vampires and Maggot Men is an album by the death metal band Abscess. It was released by Relapse Records in 1996.

Track listing
  "Naked Freak Show"  (1:15)
  "Freak Fuck Fest (Naked FreakShow II: Orgy of the Gaffed)"  (1:39)
  "Patient Zero"  (1:32)
  "Zombie Ward"  (1:54)
  "Mud"  (1:15)
  "Stiff and Ditched"  (1:12)
  "Fatfire"  (3:11)
  "I Don't Give a Fuck"  (2:23)
  "Burn, Die and Fucking Fry"  (1:29)
  "Global Doom"  (1:43)
  "Removing the Leech"  (1:53)
  "Pinworms"  (2:40)
  "Gonna Mow You Down"  (1:13)
  "Disgruntled"  (1:30)
  "Tunnel of Horrors"  (2:28)
  "Worm Sty Infection"  (1:53)
  "Dirty Little Brats"  (2:05)
  "The Scent of Shit"  (0:42)

References

Abscess (band) albums
1996 albums
Relapse Records albums